The Macchi M.5 was an Italian single-seat fighter flying boat designed and built by Nieuport-Macchi at Varese. It was extremely manoeuvrable and agile and matched the land-based aircraft it had to fight.

Development
The first prototype of a single-seat sesquiplane fighter was the Type M which first flew in 1917. Developed by engineers Buzio and Calzavera it had a single-step hull and an open cockpit forward of the wings and was similar to the earlier Macchi M.3. It was followed by another prototype with a revised tail unit designated the Ma and further developed as the M bis and Ma bis. The production aircraft was designated the M.5 and like the prototypes was powered by a single Isotta Fraschini V.4B engine in pusher configuration. Deliveries soon commenced in the summer of 1917 to the Aviazione per la Regia Marina (Italian Navy Aviation). Late production aircraft had a more powerful Isotta Fraschini V.6 engine and redesigned wingtip floats, they were designated M.5 mod. Macchi produced 200 aircraft and another 44 were built by Società Aeronautica Italiana.

Operational history
During World War I, the M.5 was operated by five Italian maritime patrol squadrons as a fighter and convoy escort, and some were embarked on the Regia Marina seaplane carrier Giuseppe Miraglia. Towards the end of World War I, M.5 aircraft were flown by both United States Navy and United States Marine Corps airmen. For his actions while flying an M.5 over the Adriatic Sea off the coast of Austria-Hungary on 21 August 1918, U.S. Navy Ensign Charles Hammann, an enlisted pilot at the time, received the first Medal of Honor awarded to a United States naval aviator.

In 1923, when the Regia Aeronautica was formed, 65 M.5s were still in service, although they all had been scrapped within a few years.

In popular culture
In the 1992 Japanese animated film Porco Rosso, Porco's fighter when he served with the Regia Marina′s aviation branch during World War I was a Macchi M.5.

Operators

Regia Marina
Corpo Aeronautico Militare

United States Navy
United States Marine Corps
 
Brazilian Navy 12 brazilian pilots trained in these planes, but the war ended before they can participate it

Specifications (Macchi M.5)

See also

References

1910s Italian fighter aircraft
Flying boats
M.05
Sesquiplanes
Single-engined pusher aircraft
Aircraft first flown in 1917